Saint Columban College is a private, Catholic, coeducational basic and higher education institution run by the Roman Catholic Diocese of Pagadian in Pagadian City, Zamboanga del Sur, Philippines. Founded in 1957 as Saint Columban School, it is the largest among the Diocesan Schools of Pagadian. Columban offers primary, secondary and tertiary education. The Accountancy and Information Technology programs are distinguished as a Center for Excellence and Center for Excellence and Development, respectively.

History

Saint Columban School
Saint Columban College was founded as Saint Columban School in 1957 by Fr. Sean Nolan of the Missionary Society of St. Columban with Sisters Teresita del Niño Jesus Reyes, Isabel of the Angels Narciso, Marie Odille Cayetano, and Anne Bacomo of the Sisters of Saint Paul de Chartres. Under the leadership of Fr. Patrick Campion, S.S.C., Saint Columban School went "full operation" offering only secondary education.

In 1963, Columban started offering undergraduate programs in Liberal Arts, Education, Secretarial, and Commerce. To accommodate the new college students, a new three-story building was built on the main campus.

In 1965, Columban opened the elementary school under Sister Eugenie de Marie, SPC, as principal.

Saint Columbans College

Saint Columbans School grew into a college and in 1967 it was renamed Saint Columban College. By 1970, the college programs were transferred to the present college campus in Cerilles-Sagun Streets.

In 1978, the Roman Catholic Diocese of Pagadian took over the administration and control of the college from the Missionary Society of St. Columban through Bishop Jesus B. Tuquib. Tuquib became chairman of the Board Trustees. Fr. Jose Maria Luengo was subsequently installed as the first Filipino President of the college. The "SCC Hymn" was later composed by Luengo with Bishop Patricio Getigan and Sister Agnes Lawrence Catalan.

On its 25th Anniversary in 1982, Columban inaugurated a new four-storey building in the college campus which today houses the College of Business Education.

Recent History and Present

The College of Computer Studies opened in 2002. Its Information Technology program is now recognized by the Commission on Higher Education as a Center for Excellence and Development.

On November 8, 2006, a fire incident reduced the main building at the high school campus into ashes displacing some classes for a year. Spare rooms and repurposed laboratories at the high school and grade school campuses housed the displaced classes.

In 2008, Columban inaugurated the first phase of the new and bigger main building at the high school campus. The building now houses majority of the classes, the chemistry laboratory, two computer laboratories, the audio-visual room, library, school clinic, and offices of the faculty, school treasurer, registrar, guidance counselor, and school principal.

The college campus received a facade overhaul in 2011 with the construction of the St. Therese Building. The building houses administrative offices, the guidance and counseling center, and the college chapel.

Governance

Columban is governed by the Board of Trustees led by Bishop Emmanuel Cabajar of Pagadian, as chairman. In a concelebrated mass during the "Pasalamat Festival" in January 2017, Fr. Rico P. Sayson, J.C.L. was installed as School President replacing Fr. Gilbert M. Hingone, S.T.L.

Campuses
Columban has four campuses. The grade school and high school campuses are divided only by the boundary between Balangasan and Sto. Niño districts of the city.
 Grade school campus in Balangasan district
 High school campus in Sto. Niño district
 Since the implementation of the K-12 Program, the High School Department has been divided to two units; namely, the Junior and Senior High Schools. The high school campus houses the Junior High School.
 College campus at Cerilles-Sagun Streets in downtown Pagadian
 The college campus houses the undergraduate programs and the Senior High School.
 The new Buenavista Campus is occupied by the college of business education

Facilities
Libraries
SCC has three libraries; one in each campus.
Worship and Prayer
Grade school chapel
Chapel of the Immaculate Conception at the high school campus
College chapel
Convention, Sports, and Recreation
SCC Youth Development Center (SCC-YDC) Gymnasium in Sagun Street, Pagadian City
SCC Alumni Association Sports Complex at the grade school campus
Kiosk-cum-gazebo at the high school campus
Specialized Instruction
Hotel and Restaurant Management Laboratory at the Diocesan Pastoral Center
An operational hotel-school that provides training for students of the Hotel and Restaurant Management program.
iMac Computer Laboratory at the college campus
Equipped with iMac computers for the exclusive use of students of the Entertainment and Multimedia Computing program.

Publications

 Grade School: Star Line Publication
 High School: The Link Publication
 Senior High School: The Capstone/Ang Hiraya Publication
 College: The Harp Publication

Recognitions

 Center for Academic Excellence in Accountancy and Education for Region IX.
 Center for Academic Excellence and Development in Information Technology for Region IX.

See also
 Roman Catholic Diocese of Pagadian
 Diocesan Schools Group of Pagadian
 Pagadian City
 Zamboanga del Sur

References

External links
 www.SCCPag.edu.ph - Official website
 Catholic Educational Association of the Philippines
 Roman Catholic Diocese of Pagadian

Catholic elementary schools in the Philippines
Catholic secondary schools in the Philippines
Catholic universities and colleges in the Philippines
Schools in Pagadian
Universities and colleges in Zamboanga del Sur